HMS or hms may refer to:

Education 
 Habib Medical School, of the Islamic University in Uganda
 Hartley–Melvin–Sanborn Community School District of Iowa, United States
 Harvard Medical School of Harvard University
 Heidelberg Middle School, a former American school in Heidelberg, Germany
 Hongwanji Mission School, in Hawaii, United States
 Horley Methodist School, Teluk Intan, in Malaysia

Medicine and science 
 Hartford Medical Society, an American professional association based in Hartford, Connecticut
Health management system
 Hexose monophosphate shunt, an alternative name for the pentose phosphate pathway
 Highly migratory species, a classification of fish
 Hypermobility spectrum disorder, formerly hypermobility syndrome or HMS
 HMS, a brand name of medrysone

Technology 
Huawei Mobile Services, proprietary apps and services from Huawei bundled with Android devices
 HMS Networks, a company in the field of industrial communications
 Heavy melting steel
 Helmet mounted sight
 Hybrid Management Sub-Layer, in networking
 Munter hitch, a type of knot
 Handheld, Manpack, Small Form Factor, in the US Joint Tactical Radio System

Other uses 
 Her or His Majesty's Ship, a ship prefix
 Hellenic Mathematical Society, a Greek learned society
 Helmsdale railway station, Scotland, station code
 Helsinki Motor Show
 Hendrick Motorsports, a NASCAR racing team
 Hind Mazdoor Sabha, an Indian trade union
 Historical Maritime Society, UK
 HMS Group, Russian industrial and engineering holding
 Hours, minutes, seconds, sometimes "h:m:s", dividing hours into smaller units